The Peak River, a perennial stream that is part of the Murrumbidgee catchment within the Murray–Darling basin, is located in the Snowy Mountains region of New South Wales, Australia.

Course and features
The Peak River rises below Bogong Peaks, on the northeastern slopes of Mount Bogong within the Bongong Range, part of the Snowy Mountains, contained within the Kosciuszko National Park. The river flows generally north before reaching its confluence with the Goobarragandra River near Macks Crossing. The river descends  over its  course.

See also

 List of rivers of New South Wales (L-Z)
 List of rivers of Australia
 Rivers of New South Wales

References

External links
 

Rivers of New South Wales
Murray-Darling basin
Snowy Mountains
Snowy Valleys Council